Jelena Janković and Li Na were the defending champions but lost in the first round to Ji Chunmei and Sun Shengnan.

Chan Yung-jan and Chuang Chia-jung won in the final 7–6(7–3), 6–3 against Sun Tiantian and Meilen Tu.

Seeds
Champion seeds are indicated in bold text while text in italics indicates the round in which those seeds were eliminated.

Draw

References
 2007 DFS Classic Draws
 ITF Tournament Page
 ITF doubles results page

DFS Classic - Doubles
Doubles

fr:Classic de Birmingham 2007
pl:DFS Classic 2007
sk:DFS Classic 2007